The list of Olympic men's ice hockey players for Italy consisted of 119 skaters and 15 goaltenders (check numbers; not right). Men's ice hockey tournaments have been staged at the Olympic Games since 1920 (it was introduced at the 1920 Summer Olympics, and was permanently added to the Winter Olympic Games in 1924). Italy has participated in nine tournaments, the first in 1936 and most recently in 2006. Italy has never finished higher than seventh at the Olympics, which they achieved at the 1956 Winter Olympics. Their lowest finish was fifteenth, of sixteen teams, in 1964. 

Lucio Topatigh has played in the most Olympic tournaments, 4, and also played in the most games, 23. Bruno Zarrillo has scored the most goals, 10, and points, 15, while Gaetano Orlando has the most assists, 8.



Key

Goaltenders

Skaters

Notes

References

 
 
 
 
 
 

Ice hockey
Italy
Italy